Cloverdale is an unincorporated community in Shelby County, Alabama, United States, located along Alabama State Route 53,  north-northeast of Vincent.

References

Unincorporated communities in Shelby County, Alabama
Unincorporated communities in Alabama